ISM Racing is a former auto racing team owned by Bob Hancher. The team fielded entries in the Indy Racing League and the NASCAR Winston Cup Series.

Indy Racing League
ISM fielded cars in the IRL from 1997 to 1999. In 1998, Jeff Ward finished 6th in IRL driver points and won the pole at Phoenix in an ISM car and the team fielded three cars in the 1998 Indianapolis 500. However, the team was only able to run part-time in 1999 and shut down in July of that year. The IRL team used G-Force chassis and Oldsmobile engines.

ISM IRL drivers
Jim Guthrie (1998)
Steve Knapp (1998-1999)
Jeff Ward (1997-1999)

Complete IRL IndyCar Series results
(key) (Results in bold indicate pole position; results in italics indicate fastest lap)

 In conjunction with Sinden Racing Services.

NASCAR: Team Tabasco

ISM started its NASCAR operation in 1997, starting as a part-time operation with the intent of running the full 1998 Winston Cup season. The team received backing from McIlhenny Company, the makers of Tabasco hot sauce, and hired Todd Bodine, who had last raced full-time in Winston Cup in 1995 for Butch Mock Motorsports, to drive the team's #35 Pontiac. The team attempted the UAW-GM Quality 500 at Charlotte and the season finale at Atlanta, finishing 26th in the former and failing to qualify in the latter.

1998 started off poorly for Bodine as he failed to qualify for the Daytona 500 and the following two races. The team followed this up with an unexpected front row start at Atlanta, and recorded its first top ten when Bodine finished tenth. This would be the only top ten the team would record, and after running 27th at Darlington and 29th at Bristol, the #35 missed the race at Texas. Bodine then ran 39th at Martinsville before missing the race at California Speedway with an injury suffered in a practice crash. Wally Dallenbach, Jr. brought the car home in 29th, after starting 42nd. 

Despite the #35's struggles, McIlhenny was not initially upset with the results as they had been largely focused on using their sponsorship as a giant marketing tool. Things began to change when, after he only qualified for five of the first thirteen races of the season, Bodine was released from his contract. After only qualifying for one additional race with Gary Bradberry attempting the July race at New Hampshire, Hancher decided to exit NASCAR and sold the #35 to Tyler Jet Motorsports.

References

American auto racing teams
Defunct NASCAR teams
IndyCar Series teams
McIlhenny family
1997 establishments in the United States
1999 disestablishments in the United States